The 1992 Manchester bombing was an attack by the Provisional Irish Republican Army (IRA) on Thursday, 3 December 1992. Two  bombs exploded, wounding 64 people and damaging several buildings in the city of Manchester.

Bombing
The first bomb to explode was inside a car that was parked at Parsonage Gardens in the commercial district of the city. The car bomb was behind a House of Fraser store and exploded at 8:31 am, injuring six people. The second bomb exploded on Cateaton Street between a market and Manchester Cathedral at 10:09 am, wounding 58 people and damaging many buildings. The impact smashed the face of the cathedral clock and its stained glass windows. The cathedral provided refuge to hundreds of people who moved out of Deansgate.

Aftermath
A phone call was made after the bombings, claiming more devices were in the city, forcing the police to evacuate the entire city centre of shoppers and tell others to remain indoors. No other bombs were found. The damage was estimated to have been to the value of £10 million (equivalent to about £19 million in 2017).

Perpetrators
The day after the bombing, the Provisional IRA claimed responsibility for the act, which was part of their wider bombing campaign throughout the 1990s in England. Four years later, they detonated another, much more powerful, bomb in Manchester.

See also
Chronology of Provisional Irish Republican Army actions (1992–1999)

References

1992 in England
Explosions in 1992
1992 crimes in the United Kingdom
1990s in Manchester
Car and truck bombings in England
December 1992 events in the United Kingdom
Provisional IRA bombings in England
Terrorist incidents in Manchester
Building bombings in England